QRB may refer to:
 Qualitätssicherungssystem Recycling Baustoffe
 The Quarterly Review of Biology
 Queenstown Road railway station has National Rail code QRB
 QRB is Q code for "What is your distance?"
 Qué Rica Bieja